Sarva may refer to:

 Sarva (music), a musical genre of Iran
 , meaning "archer", an epithet of the Vedic deity Rudra, and subsequently of the Hindu deity Shiva